This list of the Mesozoic life of Tennessee contains the various prehistoric life-forms whose fossilized remains have been reported from within the US state of Tennessee and are between 252.17 and 66 million years of age.

A

 †Aciculiscala
 †Aciculiscala acuta
 Acirsa
 †Acirsa americana – type locality for species
 †Acirsa cerithiformis
 †Acirsa corrugata
 †Acirsa cretacea
 †Acirsa microstriata
 †Acirsa wadei
 Acmaea
 †Acmaea galea
  †Acteon
 †Acteon conicus – type locality for species
 †Acteon ellipticus – type locality for species
 †Acteon modicellus
 †Acteon pistilliformis
 †Acteon substriatus – type locality for species
 †Acteonina
 †Acteonina orientalis – type locality for species
 †Acteonina parva – type locality for species
 †Acutostrea
 †Acutostrea plumosa
 †Aenona
 †Aenona eufalensis
 Alderina
 †Alderina nelsoni – type locality for species
 †Amaurellina
 †Amaurellina stephensoni
  Amauropsis
 †Amauropsis lirata – type locality for species
 †Ambigostrea
 †Ambigostrea tecticosta
 Ammatophora
 †Ammatophora cretacea – type locality for species
 Amphiblestrum
 †Amphiblestrum denticulatum – type locality for species
  †Ampullina
 †Ampullina lirata
 †Ampullina potens – type locality for species
 †Ampullina umbilica
 Amuletum
 †Amuletum fasciolatum
 †Amuletum macnairyensis
 †Anatimya
 †Anatimya lata
 †Anchura
 †Anchura calcaris – type locality for species
 †Anchura convexa – type locality for species
 †Anchura noakensis – tentative report
 †Anchura pergracilis
 †Anchura quadrilirata – type locality for species
 †Anchura substriata – type locality for species
  †Ancilla
 †Ancilla acutula
 †Anomalofusus
 †Anomalofusus substriatus
  †Anomia
 †Anomia argentaria
 †Anomia perlineata – type locality for species
 †Anomia tellinoides
 †Anomoeodus
 Anteglosia
 †Anteglosia subornata
 †Anteglosia tennesseensis
 †Aphrodina
 †Aphrodina tippana
  †Arca
 †Arca mcnairyensis – type locality for species
 †Arca pergracilis – type locality for species
 †Arca securiculata – type locality for species
 Arctica
 †Arctica incerta – type locality for species
 †Aspidolithus
 †Aspidolithus parcus
 †Astandes
 †Astandes densatus
  †Avitelmessus
 †Avitelmessus grapsoideus

B

  †Baculites
 †Baculites grandis
 †Baculites ovatus
  Barbatia
 †Barbatia cochlearis – type locality for species
 †Barbatia fractura – type locality for species
 †Barbatia saffordi
 †Bellifusus
 †Bellifusus angulicostatus
 †Bellifusus curvicostatus
 †Bellifusus spinosus
 †Belliscala – or unidentified comparable form
 †Belliscala rockensis
 Berenicea
 †Beretra
 †Beretra gracilis
 †Beretra ripleyana
 †Beretra speciosa
 †Bizarrus
 †Bizarrus abnormalis – type locality for species
 †Boltenella
 †Boltenella excellens
 Brachidontes
 †Buccinopsis
 †Buccinopsis crassa
 †Buccinopsis crassicostata
 †Buccinopsis solida

C

 Cadulus
 †Cadulus obnutus
 Caestocorbula
 †Caestocorbula crassiplica
 Callianassa
 †Callianassa mortoni
 †Calliomphalus
 †Calliomphalus americanus – type locality for species
 †Calliomphalus angustus
 †Calliomphalus argenteus – type locality for species
 †Calliomphalus argenteus spinosus
 †Calliomphalus conanti
 †Calliomphalus decoris
 Callopora
 †Callopora anatina – type locality for species
 †Callopora sulcata – type locality for species
 †Callopora torquata – type locality for species
  Cancellaria
 †Cancellaria acuta – type locality for species
 †Cancellaria macnairyensis
 †Caprinella
 †Caprinella coraloidea
  Capulus
 †Capulus corrugatus – type locality for species
 †Capulus monroei
 
 †Cardium kuemmeli
 †Cardium stantoni – type locality for species
 †Caveola
 †Caveola acuta
 Cerithiopsis
 †Cerithiopsis meeki – type locality for species
 †Cerithiopsis quadrilirata – type locality for species
  Cerithium
 †Cerithium nodoliratum – type locality for species
 †Cerithium percostatum – type locality for species
 †Cerithium semirugatum – type locality for species
 †Cerithium weeksi – type locality for species
  Charonia
 †Charonia univaricosum – type locality for species
  Chiton
 †Chiton cretaceous
 †Cinulia
 †Cinulia paraquensis – type locality for species
 Clavagella
 †Clavagella armata
  Cliona
 †Colombellina
 †Colombellina americana – type locality for species
 Conopeum
 †Conopeum ovatum – type locality for species
 †Conopeum parviporum – type locality for species
 †Conopeum prismaticum – type locality for species
 †Conopeum wadei – type locality for species
 †Conorbis
 †Conorbis mcnairyensis
  Corbula
 †Corbula paracrassa – type locality for species
 †Corbula suffalciata – type locality for species
 †Corbula torta
 †Corbula williardi – type locality for species
  †Crania – tentative report
 †Crania americana – type locality for species
 Crassatella
 †Crassatella linteus
 †Crassatella vadosa
 †Crenella
 †Crenella elegantula
 †Crenella serica
 †Creonella
 †Creonella secunda – type locality for species
 †Creonella subangulata
 †Creonella triplicata
 †Cryptoconus – tentative report
 †Cryptoconus macnairyensis
 †Cryptorhytis
 †Cryptorhytis nobilis – type locality for species
 †Cryptorhytis torta – type locality for species
  Cucullaea
 †Cucullaea capax
 †Cucullaea littlei
 †Cucullaea vulgaris
 Cyclina
 †Cyclina magna – type locality for species
 †Cyclina parva
 Cylichna
 †Cylichna incisa
 †Cylichna intermissia
 †Cylichna intermissia curta
 †Cylichna pessumata
 †Cylichna recta
 †Cylindrotruncatum
 †Cylindrotruncatum demersum
 †Cymbophora
 †Cymbophora gracilis
 †Cyprimeria
 †Cyprimeria alta
 †Cyprimeria depressa

D

 †Dakoticancer
 †Dakoticancer overana
  †Dentalium
 †Dentalium inornatum – type locality for species
 †Dentalium intercalatum – type locality for species
 †Dentalium ripleyanum
 †Deussenia
 †Deussenia bellalirata
 †Deussenia microstriata
 †Dircella
 †Dircella spillmani
  †Discoscaphites
 †Discoscaphites iris
  †Dolicholatirus
 †Dolicholatirus torquatus
 †Dreissensia
 †Dreissensia tippana
 †Drepanochilus
 †Drepanochilus quadriliratus
 †Drilluta
 †Drilluta communis
 †Drilluta dimurorum – type locality for species
 †Drilluta distans
 †Drilluta major
 †Dysnoetopora – type locality for genus
 †Dysnoetopora celleporoides – type locality for species

E

 †Ecphora
 †Ecphora proquadricostata
 †Ellipsoscapha
 †Ellipsoscapha cylindrica
  †Enchodus
 †Endoptygma
 †Endoptygma leprosa
 †Enoploclytia
 †Enoploclytia sculpta – type locality for species
 †Eoacteon
 †Eoacteon ellipticus
 †Eoacteon linteus
 †Eoacteon percultus
 †Eothoracosaurus
 †Eothoracosaurus mississippiensis
 †Eriptycha – tentative report
 †Eriptycha americana – type locality for species
 †Etea
 †Etea carolinesis
 †Eucycloscala
 †Eucycloscala tuberculata
 †Eulima
 †Eulima clara – type locality for species
 †Eulima impressa – type locality for species
 †Eulima laevigata – type locality for species
 †Eulima persimplica
 †Euspira
 †Euspira halli
 †Euspira rectilabrum
 Euthriofusus – tentative report
 †Euthriofusus convexus
 †Euthriofusus mesozoicus
  †Eutrephoceras
 †Eutrephoceras dekayi
 †Exilia
 †Exilia ripleyana – type locality for species
  †Exogyra
 †Exogyra cancellata
 †Exogyra costata

F

 Falsifusus
 †Falsifusus convexus – type locality for species
 †Falsifusus mesozoicus
  Fasciolaria – tentative report
 †Fasciolaria ripleyana – type locality for species
 †Frurionella – type locality for genus
 †Frurionella grandipora – type locality for species
 †Frurionella parvipora – type locality for species
 †Fulgerca
 †Fulgerca attenuata – type locality for species
 †Fusimilis
 †Fusimilis proxima
 †Fusimilis tippanus

G

  Gastrochaena
 †Gastrochaena americana
 †Gegania
 †Gegania parabella
  Gemmula
 †Gemmula cretacea
 Gephyrotes
 †Gephyrotes lamellaria – type locality for species
 †Gervilliopsis
 †Gervilliopsis ensiformis
 Glossus
 †Glossus conradi
  Glycymeris
 †Glycymeris lacertosa – type locality for species
 †Glycymeris microsulci – type locality for species
 †Glycymeris subcrenata – type locality for species
 †Goniocylichna – type locality for genus
 †Goniocylichna bisculpturata – type locality for species
 †Graciliala
 †Graciliala calcaris
 †Graciliala decemlirata
 †Granocardium
 †Granocardium dumosum
 †Granocardium tenuistriatum
 †Granocardium tippananum
 †Graphidula
 †Graphidula cancellata
 †Graphidula obscura
 †Graphidula pergracilis
 †Gryphaeostrea
 †Gryphaeostrea vomer
 Gyrodes
 †Gyrodes alveata
 †Gyrodes americanus
 †Gyrodes crenata
 †Gyrodes major – type locality for species
 †Gyrodes spillmani
 †Gyrodes supraplicatus

H

 †Hamulus
 †Hamulus angulatus
 †Hamulus onyx
 †Hamulus squamosus
 †Haplovoluta
 †Haplovoluta bicarinata
 †Helicaulax
 †Helicaulax formosa
 †Helicoceras
 †Helicoceras navarroense
 †Hemiacirsa
 †Hemiacirsa cretacea
 Hemiaster
 †Hemiaster lacunosus
 †Hemiaster stella
 †Hemiaster ungula
 †Hercorhyncus
 †Hercorhyncus bicarinatus
 †Hercorhyncus pagodaformis
 †Hercorhyncus tennesseensis
 Heteropora
 †Heteropora tennesseensis – type locality for species
 †Hippocampoides
 †Hippocampoides liratus – type locality for species
 †Hippocampoides serratus
  †Hoploparia
 †Hoploparia tennesseensis – type locality for species
 †Hydrotribulus
 †Hydrotribulus nodosus

I

 †Icanotia
 †Icanotia pulchra – type locality for species
  †Inoceramus
 †Inoceramus proximus
 †Inoceramus sagensis
 †Inoperna
 †Inoperna carolinensis
 †Ischyrhiza
 †Ischyrhiza mira

J

 Juliacorbula
 †Juliacorbula monmouthensis

L

 †Lacrimiforma
 †Lacrimiforma secunda
 †Latiala
 †Latiala lobata – type locality for species
  Latiaxis
 †Latiaxis serratus
 †Laxispira
 †Laxispira lumbricalis
 †Leda
 †Leda whitfieldi
 †Legumen
 †Legumen planulatum
 Leiostraca
 †Leiostraca cretacea
 †Lemniscolittorina
 †Lemniscolittorina berryi
 †Leptosolen
 †Leptosolen biplicata
 Limatula
 †Limatula woodsi – type locality for species
 Limopsis
 †Limopsis meeki – type locality for species
 †Limopsis perbrevis – type locality for species
 †Linearis
 †Linearis metastriata
 †Linearis ornatissima
 †Liopeplum
 †Liopeplum canalis
 †Liopeplum carinatum – type locality for species
 †Liopeplum cretaceum
 †Liopeplum leioderma
 †Liopeplum leiodermum
 †Liopeplum subjugosum
 †Liopistha
 †Liopistha inflata
 †Liopistha protexta
 †Liothyris
 †Liothyris carolinensis
 †Lirosoma
 †Lirosoma cretacea
  Lithophaga
 †Lithophaga conchafodentis
 †Lithophaga ripleyana
  Littorina
 †Littorina berryi – type locality for species
 †Lomirosa
 †Lomirosa cretacea
 †Longoconcha
 †Longoconcha tennesseensis
  Lopha
 †Lopha falcata
 †Lowenstamia
 †Lowenstamia liratus
 †Lucina
 †Lucina ripleyana – type locality for species
 †Lupira
 †Lupira turbinea
 †Lupira variabilis

M

 †Mammila
 †Mammila americana – type locality for species
 Martesia
 †Martesia procurva – type locality for species
 †Martesia truncata – type locality for species
 †Mataxa
 †Mataxa elegans
 †Mathilda
 †Mathilda ripleyana
 †Mathildia
 †Mathildia ripleyana – type locality for species
 Melanatria
 †Melanatria cretacea – type locality for species
  Membranipora
 †Membranipora crassimargo – type locality for species
 Membraniporella
 †Membraniporella irregularis – type locality for species
 Meretrix
 †Meretrix cretacea
 †Meretrix eufaulensis
 †Mesorhytis
 †Mesorhytis obscura – type locality for species
 †Mesostoma
 †Mesostoma americanum – type locality for species
 †Mesostoma costatum – type locality for species
 †Metopaster
 †Metopaster tennesseensis – type locality for species
 †Micrabacia
 †Micrabacia marylandica
 Micropora
 †Micropora baccata – type locality for species
 †Mitridomus
 †Mitridomus ripleyana
 †Morea
 †Morea cancellaria
 †Morea corsicanensis
 †Morea marylandica
  †Mosasaurus
 †Mosasaurus maximus
 †Mystriopora – tentative report
 †Mystriopora stipata – type locality for species

N

 †Napulus
 †Napulus reesidei
 †Neithea
 †Neithea quinquecostata
 †Nemodon
 †Nemodon eufaulensis
 †Nemodon grandis – type locality for species
 †Nemodon stantoni
 †Nonactaeonina
 †Nonactaeonina orientalis
 †Notopocorystes
 †Notopocorystes testacea – type locality for species
   Nucula
 †Nucula microconcentrica – type locality for species
 †Nucula percrassa
 Nuculana
 †Nuculana australis – type locality for species
 †Nudivagus
 †Nudivagus simplicus

O

 †Obeliscus
 †Obeliscus conellus
 †Odontobasis
 †Odontobasis australis – type locality for species
 †Odontofusus
 †Odontofusus curvicostata – type locality for species
  †Odostomia
 †Odostomia impressa – type locality for species
 †Odostomia plicata – type locality for species
 †Oligoptycha
 †Oligoptycha americana
 Opalia
 †Opalia fistulosa
 †Opalia wadei
 †Ornopsis
 †Ornopsis digressa – type locality for species
 †Ornopsis elevata
 †Ornopsis glenni
  Ostrea
 †Ostrea bryani
 †Ostrea mcnairyensis – type locality for species
 †Ostrea monmouthensis
 †Ostrea penegemmea – type locality for species

P

 †Paladmete
 †Paladmete cancellaria
 †Paladmete densata – type locality for species
 †Paladmete gardnerae – type locality for species
 †Paleopsephaea – type locality for genus
 †Paleopsephaea mutabilis – type locality for species
 †Paleopsephaea pergracilis – type locality for species
 Panopea
 †Panopea desica
 †Parafusus
 †Parafusus callilateris
 †Parafusus coloratus
 †Parafusus saffordi
 †Paramorea
 †Paramorea lirata
 † Paranomia
 †Paranomia scabra
 †Parietiplicatum
 †Parietiplicatum conicum
 †Parvivoluta – type locality for genus
 †Parvivoluta concinna – type locality for species
  †Pecten
 †Pecten argillensis
 †Pecten burlingtonensis
 †Pecten quinquenarius
 †Pecten simplicius
 †Pedalion
 †Pedalion periridescens – type locality for species
 †Peneus
 †Peneus wenasogensis – type locality for species
 Periploma
 †Periploma applicata
 †Perissolax
 †Perissolax whitfieldi
  Pholadomya
 †Pholadomya conradi
 †Pholadomya occidentalis
 †Piestochilus
 †Piestochilus cancellatus – type locality for species
 †Piestochilus pergracilis – type locality for species
  †Plioplatecarpus
 †Plioplatecarpus depressus
 †Podocratus
 †Podocratus canadensis
   Polinices
 †Polinices kummeli
 †Polinices stephensoni – type locality for species
 †Polinices umbilica – type locality for species
 †Polyascosoecia
 †Polyascosoecia tripora – type locality for species
 †Postligata
 †Postligata crenata – type locality for species
 †Postligata wordeni
 †Praeleda
 †Praeleda compar
  †Prognathodon
 †Promathildia
 †Promathildia cretacea – type locality for species
 †Protobusycon
 †Protobusycon cretaceum
 †Protocardia
 †Protocardia parahillana – type locality for species
 †Pseudocardia
 †Pseudocardia gregaria
 †Pseudocardia subangulata – type locality for species
 †Pseudocardia subcircula – type locality for species
 †Pseudolimea
 †Pseudolimea reticulata
 Pseudomalaxis
 †Pseudomalaxis amplificata – type locality for species
 †Pseudomalaxis pilsbryi
 †Pseudomalaxis ripleyana – type locality for species
  †Pteria
 †Pteria percompressa – type locality for species
 †Pteria petrosa
 †Pterocerella
 †Pterocerella poinsettiformis
 †Pterocerella tippana
  †Pterotrigonia
 †Pterotrigonia angulicostata
 †Pterotrigonia thoracica
 †Ptychosyca
 †Ptychosyca inornata
 †Pugnellus
 †Pugnellus densatus
 †Pugnellus goldmani
 Pulvinites
 †Pulvinites argentea
  Pycnodonte
 †Pycnodonte vesiculare
 †Pyrifusus
 †Pyrifusus ejundicus
 †Pyrifusus subdensatus
 †Pyrifusus subliratus – type locality for species
 †Pyropsis
 †Pyropsis interstriatus
 †Pyropsis perornatus
 †Pyropsis proxima – type locality for species
 †Pyropsis spinosus

R

 †Reinhardites
 †Reinhardites anthophorus
 †Remera
 †Remera stephensoni
 †Remnita
 †Remnita anomalocostata
 †Remnita biacuminata
 †Rhombopsis
 †Rhombopsis microstriatus – type locality for species
 †Rhombopsis orientalis – type locality for species
  Ringicula
 †Ringicula pulchella
  Rissoina
 †Rissoina fragilis – type locality for species
 †Rissoina subornata – type locality for species
 †Rissoina tennesseensis – type locality for species
 Rostellaria – tentative report
 †Rostellaria mcnairyensis – type locality for species

S

 †Sargana
 †Sargana stantoni
  †Saurodon – tentative report
 †Scala
 †Scala sillimani
 Scalpellum
 †Scambula
 †Scambula perplana
 Scaphander
 †Scaphander rarus – type locality for species
  †Scaphites
 †Scaphites reesidei – type locality for species
 †Schizobasis
 †Schizobasis depressa
 †Schizobasis immersa – type locality for species
  Seila
 †Seila quadrilirata
 †Seminola
 †Seminola crassa
 †Seminola solida
 Serpula
 †Serpula adnata – type locality for species
 †Serpula pervermiformis – type locality for species
   Serpulorbis
 †Serpulorbis marylandica
 †Serpulorbis tennesseensis – type locality for species
 †Serrifusus
 †Serrifusus tennesseensis – type locality for species
  †Siphonaria
 †Siphonaria wieseri – type locality for species
 †Solariorbis
 †Solariorbis clara
 †Solyma
 †Solyma elliptica
 †Stantonella – type locality for genus
 †Stantonella subnodosa – type locality for species
 †Stephanophyllia
 †Stephanophyllia cribraria
 Striarca
 †Striaticostatum
 †Striaticostatum pondi
 †Syncyclonema
 †Syncyclonema simplicius

T

 †Tectaplica
 †Tectaplica simplica
 Teinostoma
 †Teinostoma prenanum – type locality for species
  Tellina
 †Tellina multiconcentrica – type locality for species
 †Tellinimera
 †Tellinimera eborea
 †Tenea
 †Tenea parilis
 †Teredo
 †Teredo rectus – type locality for species
 †Thylacus
 †Thylacus cretaceus
 †Tintorium
 †Tintorium pagodiforme
 †Tornatellaea
 †Tornatellaea cretacea – type locality for species
 †Tornatellaea globulosa – type locality for species
  †Toxochelys
 †Toxochelys latiremis
  Trichotropis
 †Trichotropis imperfecta – type locality for species
  †Trigonia
 †Trigonia eufalensis
 †Trochifusus
 †Trochifusus interstriatus – type locality for species
 †Trochifusus perornatus – type locality for species
 †Trochifusus spinosus – type locality for species
  Trochus
 †Trochus ripleyanus – type locality for species
 †Troostella – type locality for genus
 †Troostella perimpressa – type locality for species
 †Troostella substriatus
 †Tuba
 †Tuba parabella – type locality for species
  Turbinella
 †Turbinella major – type locality for species
 †Turbinella variabilis – type locality for species
 Turboella
 †Turboella costata
 †Turricula
 †Turricula amica
 †Turricula anomalocostata – type locality for species
 †Turricula biacuminata – type locality for species
 †Turricula fasciolata – type locality for species
 †Turricula gracilis – type locality for species
 †Turricula mcnairyensis – type locality for species
 †Turricula ripleyana
 Turris
 †Turris constricta – type locality for species
 †Turris proxima – type locality for species
 Turritella
 †Turritella bilira
 †Turritella encrinoides
 †Turritella macnairyensis
 †Turritella mcnairyensis – type locality for species
 †Turritella paravertebroides
 †Turritella tippana
 †Turritella trilira
 †Turritella vertebroides

U

 †Unicardium
 †Unicardium concentricum – type locality for species
 †Urceolabrum
 †Urceolabrum tuberculatum

V

 †Variseila
 †Variseila meeki
 †Veniella
 †Veniella conradi
 †Vetericardia
 †Vetericardia crenalirata
 †Volutoderma
 †Volutoderma appressa – type locality for species
 †Volutoderma protracta
 †Volutoderma tennesseensis – type locality for species
 †Volutomorpha
 †Volutomorpha aspera
 †Volutomorpha gigantea – type locality for species
 †Volutomorpha mutabilis – type locality for species
 †Volutomorpha retifera – or unidentified comparable form

W

 †Wadeopsammia
 †Wadeopsammia nodosa – type locality for species
 †Weeksia
 †Weeksia amplificata
 †Woodsella – type locality for genus
 †Woodsella typica – type locality for species
 †Wormaldia
 †Wormaldia praemissa – type locality for species

Y

 Yoldia
 †Yoldia longifrons
 †Yoldia multiconcentrica – type locality for species

References
 

Tennessee
Mesozoic